Nicholas Gould (1635–1691), of Lime Street, London and Upwey, Dorset, was an English politician.

Family
He had two sons and three daughters.

Career
He was Mayor of Dorchester from 1680 to 1681. He was a Member (MP) of the Parliament of England for Dorchester in March and October 1679 and for Weymouth and Melcombe Regis from 1690 to 1691.

References

1635 births
1691 deaths
English MPs 1679
Politicians from London
Members of the Parliament of England for Dorchester
People from Weymouth, Dorset
Mayors of Dorchester, Dorset
English MPs 1690–1695